The PSD Bank Dome is a multi-use indoor arena in Düsseldorf, Germany, it opened in 2006. The arena has a capacity of 15,151 people and 14,282 people for hockey matches.

Events

It is used mostly for ice hockey matches, as well as concerts. Its home team is the Düsseldorfer EG.

Public transport
The ISS Dome is connected to the stations Düsseldorf-Unterrath and Düsseldorf-Rath with a shuttle bus. Both stations have direct transfer to the Rheinbahn tram lines 701, 707 and 715. Furthermore, there are connections to the suburban rail S-Bahn Rhein-Ruhr serving Düsseldorf Hauptbahnhof, Duisburg, Essen, Dortmund and Cologne. It's planned to extend tram line 701 from station Düsseldorf-Rath to the ISS Dome. With this extension the city centre of Düsseldorf would be linked directly to the ISS Dome.

See also
List of indoor arenas in Germany
List of European ice hockey arenas

References

External links

Sports venues completed in 2006
Indoor arenas in Germany
Buildings and structures in Düsseldorf
Indoor ice hockey venues in Germany
Basketball venues in Germany
Buildings and structures completed in 2006
Sports venues in North Rhine-Westphalia
Music venues completed in 2006
2006 establishments in Germany